The Mystery Club is a 1926 American silent mystery film directed by Herbert Blaché and starring Matt Moore, Edith Roberts and Mildred Harris. It was based on a story from Arthur Somers Roche's Crimes of the Armchair Club.

Cast
 Matt Moore as Dick Bernard 
 Edith Roberts as Nancy Darrell 
 Mildred Harris as Mrs. Kate Vandeerveer 
 Charles Lane as John Cranahan 
 Warner Oland as Eli Sinsabaugh 
 Henry Hebert as Scott Glendenning 
 Charles Puffy as Alonzo 
 Alphonse Martell as Sengh 
 Finch Smiles as Wilkins
 Earl Metcalfe as Red 
 Nat Carr as Eric Hudson 
 Jed Prouty as Amos Herriman 
 Alfred Allen as Insp. Burke 
 Sidney Bracey as Detective 
 Monte Montague as Snaky

References

Bibliography
 Munden, Kenneth White. The American Film Institute Catalog of Motion Pictures Produced in the United States, Part 1. University of California Press, 1997.

External links

1926 films
1926 mystery films
American mystery films
American silent feature films
Universal Pictures films
Films directed by Herbert Blaché
American black-and-white films
1920s English-language films
1920s American films
Silent mystery films